Rebecca Harris is a British film producer.

Early life 
Harris grew up in Clanfield, Hampshire.

Career 
Rebecca Harris studied film production at the University of West London, graduating in 2013.

Harris is best known for producing The Silent Child. The film won the Academy Award for Best Live Action Short Film at the 90th Academy Awards. It tells the story of Libby, a profoundly deaf four-year-old girl, played by Maisie Sly, who lives a silent life until a social worker, played by Rachel Shenton, teaches her how to communicate through sign language. The film's television debut was on BBC One to an audience of 3.6 million.

Harris produced A Glimpse, starring Rachel Shenton and Chris Overton, which garnered critical acclaim and premiered in the UK in 2019 at Raindance Film Festival, in the US in 2020 at Santa Barbara International Film Festival. and in Australia in 2020 at Flickerfest International Film Festival.

Harris was commissioned by The Uncertain Kingdom to produce the film Sucka Punch as part of an anthology of twenty short films, released on Curzon Home Cinema, Amazon Prime, Google Play and iTunes in April 2020, which together offer an alternative snapshot of the UK in the year 2020.

Recognition 
Harris received the title Honorary Doctor of Letters from The University of West London in 2018.

Awards and nominations 

On 4 March 2018, The Silent Child won the Academy Award for Best Live Action Short Film.

References 

British film producers
Year of birth missing (living people)
Living people
Alumni of the University of West London
Place of birth missing (living people)
Honorary titles
People from East Hampshire District
Producers who won the Live Action Short Film Academy Award